Nicholas Stratford (1633 – 12 February 1707) was an Anglican prelate. He served as Bishop of Chester from 1689 to 1707.

He was born at Hemel Hempstead, graduated M.A. at Trinity College, Oxford in 1656, and was Fellow there in 1657. He contributed to the royalist poetry anthology Britannia Rediviva in 1660, writing in Latin. He became Dean of St Asaph in 1673.

He was one of the founders of the Blue Coat School in Chester. It closed in 1949, and its premises are now part of the University of Chester and local government buildings. He promoted good relations with the Chester nonconformist Matthew Henry, and supported the Society for the Reformation of Manners.

See also
List of bishops of Chester

Notes

1633 births
1707 deaths
Bishops of Chester
17th-century Church of England bishops
18th-century Church of England bishops
People associated with the University of Chester
Deans of St Asaph